All Is Well is a Chinese television series that premiered on Zhejiang Television and Jiangsu Television on March 1, 2019. The series is directed by Jian Chuanhe, and stars Yao Chen, Ni Dahong, Guo Jingfei, Li Nian, Tony Yang, Gao Xin, and Gao Lu. It is an adaptation of Ah Nai's novel, which shares the same title as the show. The series depicts the conflicts and struggles of a white-collar worker and her family members.

Synopsis 

The Su family collapses instantly with the sudden death of Mother Su, revealing unexpected and hidden dangers. The problem of caring for the non-assertive but selfish and stingy Father Su, disrupts the peaceful life of his children and their families. Finally rid of his wife's control, Father Su Daqiang makes constant and excessive demands on his children. Su Mingzhe, the eldest son, returns to China from the United States, determined to support the family. He is unable to bear the burden and becomes alienated from his wife and daughter. The second son, Su Mingcheng (a NEET), has no regrets. He expects to suddenly become rich, which leads to a failure of both his career and his family. The youngest daughter, Su Mingyu, is unrecognized by her parents and has severed economic ties with her family since the age of 18. She has vowed to draw a line in her dealings with the family, but she is dragged into the quagmire of the Su family once more. The family helps each other through continuous crises. Ultimately, the members of the Su family realize communication between them cannot be ignored, and the family is once again filled with love.

Cast

Main
 Yao Chen as Su Mingyu, the only daughter of the Su family, a white-collar worker.
 An Weiwei as young Su Mingyu
 Ni Dahong as Su Daqiang, the father of the Su family.
Guo Jingfei as Su Mingcheng, the second son of the Su family, a boomerang kid.
 Li Junting as young Su Mingcheng
 Li Nian as Zhu Li, Su Mingcheng's wife.
 Tony Yang as Shi Tiandong, the boss of a small restaurant, Su Mingyu's love interest. 
Gao Xin as Su Mingzhe, the first son of Su family, an alumnus of Tsinghua University and Stanford University, he has high self-esteem and keen on face-saving.
 Wang Cheng as young Su Mingzhe the Su family.
Gao Lu as Wu Fei, Su Mingzhe's wife.

Supporting
 Chen Jin as Zhao Meilan, the Mother, who favors boys over girls and mistreats her daughter Su Mingyu.
 Chang Chen-kuang as President Meng, Su Mingyu's teacher and boss, president of the Zhongcheng Group.
 Wang Dong as Liu Qing, a salesperson in the Zhongcheng Group.
 Peng Yuchang as Meng's son
 Kang Qunzhi as Zhu Li's mother.
 Hou Changrong as Zhu Li's father.
 Tian Li as Ying Shu
 Wang Zhengquan as Uncle

Soundtrack

Production
The producers hired Ah Nai (author of the novels Ode to Joy and Like a Flowing River) to work on a script.

On October 11, 2017, actors Yao Chen and Ni Dahong were cast in lead roles for the series.

Principal photography began on January 17, 2018, and wrapped in May 2018.

Most of the series was shot on location in Suzhou, Jiangsu. The scenes of the Su family's old house were filmed in an alley of Tongdeli. The scenes set in "Shi Hun Zhe" were filmed in Han'eryuan, Pingjiang Sub district of Gusu District. The village of Mingyuewan served as the setting of the tea-leaf picking scene.

Reception
The show has a 7.8 out of 10 rating on Douban, and received mainly positive reviews. It has become a major trending topic on social media, with related hashtags being viewed hundreds of millions of times. Many people have praised the television series online for revealing problems and contradictions in real life, such as traditional Chinese families' preference for boys over girls, NEET, and generational conflicts related to caring for the elderly.

Ratings 

 Highest ratings are marked in red, lowest ratings are marked in blue

Awards and nominations

References

External links
 
 

2019 Chinese television series debuts
2019 Chinese television series endings
Chinese comedy-drama television series
Jiangsu Television original programming
Television shows based on Chinese novels
Television series by Daylight Entertainment
Zhejiang Television original programming